Voices  is a studio album by American bassist Gary Peacock featuring pianist Masabumi Kikuchi, percussionist Masahiko Togashi and drummer Hiroshi Murakami. The album was recorded in Tokyo in 1971 and released via Sony Records label.

Reception
Peter Margasak of Chicago Reader stated "On these early recordings with Peacock, Masabumi Kikuchi hadn't quite achieved the Spartan sound he eventually mastered, but he was on his way, playing mercurial lines amid Peacock's churning patterns. The 1971 album Voices, a trio session with alternating drummers Masahiko Togashi and Hiroshi Murakami, has been stuck in my CD player for days. It occupies the same meditative, questing terrain explored by Paul Bley before its release and by Keith Jarrett after. I'm a sucker for its elegant sense of dynamics, which gives empty space a crucial role in the arrangements and improvisations."

Track listing

Personnel
Band
Gary Peacock – bass
Masabumi Kikuchi – piano, electric piano
Masahiko Togashi – percussion (tracks: 1 2 3 4 6)
Hiroshi Murakami – drums (tracks: 1 2 3 5 6)

Production
Kiyoshi Ito – producer 
Kenichi Handa – recording

References

Sony Records albums
Gary Peacock albums
1971 albums